Charles Brandon Boynton (1806–1883)  was the first president of Howard University and also served as chaplain of the United States House of Representatives.

During his tenure as chaplain of the House of Representatives, Boynton was also the congregational minister of Washington's First Congregational Church, which, at the time, met in the House chamber.

Boynton was the author of A History of the Navy During the Rebellion. The book is about the United States Navy during the American Civil War.

Sources
Howard University list of presidents

list of house chaplains

External links
 Charles B. Boynton profile at House.gov

1806 births
Presidents of Howard University
1883 deaths